Lepidopoda is a genus of moths in the family Sesiidae.

Species
Lepidopoda sylphina  Hampson, 1919
Lepidopoda andrepiclera  Hampson, 1910
Lepidopoda heterogyna  Hampson, 1900
Lepidopoda lutescens  Diakonoff, [1968]

References

Sesiidae